Hinchman may refer to:

Bill Hinchman (1883–1963), professional baseball player who played outfielder in the Major Leagues from 1905 to 1920
Field, Hinchman and Smith, also known as SmithGroup, ranks as the United States' 7th largest architecture and engineering firm
Harry Hinchman (1878–1933), Major League Baseball second baseman who played for one season
Hinchman-Lippincott House, is located in Haddon Heights, New Jersey

See also

Henchman
Hincmar
Inchman (disambiguation)
Inchmoan
Nachman (disambiguation)
Winchman